The National Union of Autonomous Trade Unions of Senegal (UNSAS) is a national trade union center in Senegal. It is a federation which includes member unions in electrical, telecommunication, hospital, railroad and sugar workers, and teaching sectors.

The UNSAS is affiliated with the International Trade Union Confederation.

References

Trade unions in Senegal
International Trade Union Confederation
National federations of trade unions